Roche à Perdrix is a mountain in Alberta's Rockies, Canada.

It is located south of Highway 16 on the eastern border of Jasper National Park, and is part of the Fiddle Range, one of the easternmost ranges of the Canadian Rockies. It is one of the first mountains upon entering the park from the east and is directly on the park border.  In French, perdrix means partridge and roche  means rock.  The name is a reference to the rock foliations, which resemble a partridge's tail feathers.

It was named by the Reverend George Grant in 1872.

Climate

Based on the Köppen climate classification, it is located in a subarctic climate with cold, snowy winters, and mild summers. Precipitation runoff from the mountain flows into the Athabasca River.

References 

Alberta's Rockies
Two-thousanders of Alberta